Contern is a commune and town in southern Luxembourg. It is located east of Luxembourg City.

The main towns are Contern, Moutfort, Oetrange and Medingen. Surrounding Contern are the small settlements of Faerschthaff, Bricherhaff, Brichermillen and Kreintgeshaff. Surrounding Moutfort is Milbech, Marxeknupp, Eitermillen and Kackerterhaff. Oetrange is surrounded only by Pleitrange and Medingen is on a hill in the south east of the commune alone.

The commune also contains the industrial zones of Chaux de Contern, and Rosswenkel, as well as the activity zone of Weiergewan. The town hall was formerly situated among these industrial zones prior to the redesign of the area. Intersections became roundabouts, roads were repaved, and the railway station, Sandweiler-Contern was completely rebuilt in a new location in December 2015 for easier access from the main road in the Industrial Zone. The new town hall was built next to the church on the hill around the centre of the town.

History 
The name Contern first appeared in a charter in 879/880/903/904 AD, although its first official listing was in 1128 and it is almost certain Contern dated back to the Celtic Era.  In the 14th century it was recorded in writing as Guntrein. Contern in the 13th century got a lot of influence from Christianity and Chivalry. At this time Contern became a parish and has its church constructed. From 1945 onwards, Contern's municipal structure consisted of Contern, Oetrange, Moutfort and Medingen. The Commune of Contern has existed since the 19th century.

Archaeology 
Although no prominent archaeological sites or artifacts date back to the Celtic times, plenty has been left over since the Romans including some housing and remnants of an aqueduct. The most prominent thing from the Romans however is the Gallo-Roman villa, it stood on the current site of the town and there are still remains of it to this day.

Etymology 
Following World War II, the Luxembourgers had strong distaste for their former German overseers. This was why almost every place in the country was renamed from its original Luxembourgish name of German origin, to that of French origin without changing too much. Contern's name would have stayed Conter if it weren't for the French pronunciation of "er" being far too strong, thus an "n" was added on the end. It could have been possible to have followed what places like Hesperange did, but in the end it stuck to the name Contern. In the modern era, to encourage more Luxembougish in the commune, many documents and signs use "Conter" instead of Contern.

Settlements

Graph

Lists

Villages

Localities

Suburbs

Industrial Zones

Population
As of 1 January 2020, 3,939 live in Contern, which is a density of 188 people per square kilometre. This is set to increase in the future. Around 70% of the population are aged 15–65 and an estimated third of the commune's population consists of non-Luxembourgers. 60% of the population knows how to speak Luxembourgish and French German and even English are common amongst most of the locals. The Town of Contern has a population of 1743, a sharp increase from 2005 when it has 1083. In 2001 Contern had a population of just 1065.

Graph

Industrial Zones 

Contern consists of 2 separate industrial zones separated from each other. Although they are officially separate, they're often seen locally as one entity, even on road signs. The area where Sandweiler-Contern railway station is located is home to a lot of commercial infrastructure such as the only full-fledged supermarket in the commune, a trampoline park and the commune's only gas station. A few restaurants and eateries are also located there to serve the local workers. The area is home to more than 110 companies and over 5000 jobs and is quickly growing and receiving new developments.

Transportation

Road 
Contern is quite well connected to the road network and links to Luxembourg City however the only dual carriageway in the commune is the E29. There are plans in the next 5–10 years to build a new motorway exit on the Luxembourg Ring to serve Contern and Itzig but that hasn't been built yet.

Contern is involved with websites that provide traffic info.

Residential Parking 
On the first of January 2022 residential parking came into act. It implemented a project citizens wanted since participation in workshops on the commune's village centres and since incidents to do with the road network since 2019. The plan drawn up by the College of Alderman was to reduce long term parking specifically between 8am and 6pm. Many parking lots now have a limit of how long one can stay of 3 hours. This is said to improve the safety and quality of life of the citizens of Contern.

Bus 
Contern is served by many different bus routes as is many of the other towns within the commune.

Rail 
Contern has 2 railway stations in it, Sandweiler-Contern and Oetrange stations. Line 30 also runs through Moutfort however there's no station. Oetrange is served twice per hour by the local train which either runs to Wasserbillig or Wittlich. Sandweiler-Contern also gets served by the Regional Express which runs to Trier/Koblez. The Regional Express train bypasses Oetrange station and runs direct to Wasserbillig and in the other direction to Luxembourg in 1 stop. During frequent maintenance work on the main line between Sandweiler-Contern and the City Centre, trains run on a parallel corridor from Oetrange that goes through Syrien. This is a freight corridor used by freight trains to bypass the city and has no other regular passenger service.

Services

Education 
The commune owns and runs a school in the corner of the town. The commune monitors to ensure that Mandatory Education is enforced, the education budget is controlled, and that the school buses linking the rest of the commune with the school are operational and working well. Many local residents, especially people in secondary school, tend to have their education outside the school. There's also a school in Oetrange.

Financial 
The Communal Revenue department manages Contern's taxation, dept and accounting.

Emergency Services 
Contern is not home to any Hospitals, Medical Clinics, Police Stations or Fire Stations and must rely on neighbouring communes for such services.

Waste Collection 

Waste Collection is managed and run by the commune of Contern. There is a simple system of when garbage trucks come, what they pick up each day, and how much it all costs. The dump is located in the Op Dem Keller industrial zone in Munsbach and is shared with the commune of Shuttrange.

Urban Planning 
Contern's urban planning is run by its urban planning department. They control and manage building permits and requests. There's a 2 tier system for any form of construction or Landscaping. There's the minor intervention for small construction projects such as minor landscaping, street and sidewalk construction and the building of wells and outdoor facilities. Then there's the major interventions for construction or extension of new housing or office space, or modifications to the structure or load-bearings of existing infrastructure.

Other 
The commune also offers services for reception, revenue, technical and communications.

Politics 
Contern is a commune which has a local government and therefore a mayor and council. The Mayor is currently Marion Zovilé-Braquet.

The Mayor 
The Mayor is elected and is put in charge of municipal staff, administration, infrastructure, security, emergency services, communications, relations with other communes, schools and sport. In addition they're also in charge of the "le college Echevinal" and of the Municipal Council.

Le college Echevinal 
The college Echevinal consists of the Mayor and their 2 advisors who are all put in charge of different things. The 1st alderman is put in charge of Mobility, Weather, Fairtrade and many more smaller things, while the 2nd alderman is put in charge of, the environment, finances, agriculture and much more.

The Municipal Council 
The Municipal Council consists of 11 elected members including the 2 aldermen, the mayor and 8 councilors, they are the legislators of the municipality. Meetings happen roughly every 3 months, take place in the town hall and are public unless otherwise stated.

Coat of Arms

Description 
The Contern Coat of arms is "Argent a fess wavy Gules charged with three triangles also wavy Or, said fess accompanied in chief by a cross anchored Gules, at the base of a shell Sable."

The commune of Contern received its coat of arms on 26 July 1982. These are coats of arms in the shape of a shield divided into three parts, one for each village of the municipality.

 The upper part shows a cross derived from the coat of arms of the lords of Larochette who owned Contern from 1534 to 1731.
 The bars come from the coat of arms of the Grandpré family, lords of Roussy, who were the owners of the villages of Moutfort, Medingen and Pleitrange. The bars undulate to represent the River Syre which runs through the town.
 The lower part shows a shell derived from the coat of arms of the Metternich family to which Oetrange belonged.

Usage 
The Contern Coat of arms is used all over the commune, on the flag, outside official buildings, even on the wheelie bins. Its distinctive looks and colour make it easy to spot.

Shopping 
Contern is home to a large number of small businesses which local residents can do their shopping at. This is not only restricted to settlements as the industrial zone is home to the only Big Box Store in the commune. The other stores consist of but are not limited to grocery stores, drink shops and bakeries. Contern also has a variety of hair salons and pharmacies. Most of these are concentrated around Moutfort due to the E29 main road slicing the village in twain. The commune is full of mixed use development hence why shops although occasionally found in dedicated shopping districts, are still just as often in residential areas.

Culture, Sport and Leisure 

There are many cultural centres in Contern all of which have their own events. They are Chapel Street in Medingen, Moutfort Cultural and Sports Centre, Oetrange Cultural Centre, and "An Henks" Cultural Centre in Contern.

There are a total 7 different monuments in Contern, dotted across the various towns and serving different purposes. There are 3 different war memorials, one it Contern itself, one it Oetrange and one in Moutfort.  In Moutfort there is another monument to the liberators in Luxembourg, and in Oetrange there is a white bridge named Liberation Bridge. There are 2 smaller monuments, one in the industrial zone, and one more in Moutfort.

The Comic Strip Festival is a festival that was started by a man named Daniel Grun and has been going since 1994. It was the first of its kind in the country although that no longer stays true to this day. It is known as BD Contern.

Appelfest is an annual Autumn festival that happens in Contern, near the Gemeng. It is very well known amongst the locals and every year before happening has banners placed on the lampposts on the streets entering the town and has road signs pointing to it to inform everyone when it is happening.

Every year in March at a relatively random date, in the south-west of Contern near Hoehenhof on a small trail, a large bonfire is made and the local residents are invited to a gathering. This is a historic tradition to "burn away the winter" and say hello to spring. It has been going before mass adoption of the Christian Calendar hence does not take place the same day every year. In 2022 it took place on the 5th of March.

There are many cultural events which happen in Contern. For younger people there are a number of small play areas dotted around the commune. There is also the Yearly Christmas March, which will take place on 4–5 December in 2022.

There are many local festivals and events that happen in Contern, including Integration Week, Day of Sporting and Cultural Merit, Environment Week, Commemoration Day and many more.

Autopedestrians is a series of hiking/biking paths which are mapped out by the commune to increase use and decrease risk. There are 7 in total, all of which are clearly marked and labelled, with maps available online. Some of them leave the commune at times, while most only go between towns in Contern.

Contern has many cycle paths that are part of Regional or National collaboration. There are also many unmarked gravel or paved paths which are mostly dedicated to cyclists all across the commune. This includes many paths linking hamlets such as Faerschthaff so that their tractors can access the farm more easily. Motor vehicles excluding tractors are banned from all these paths, but they are open to cyclists.

There are a number of basketball courts and football fields within and just outside the commune. There is also a children's Football Club with a full size playing field located at Moutfort. It is the "Union Sportif Moutfort-Medingen" or USMM for short, set up in 1937. It attracts people not just from Contern but also the neighbouring communes.

Contern is also home to many public courts for Multisports and Petanque. The nearest swimming pool is regional, outside of the commune entirely in Nideranven.

Social Component 
Contern is in partnership with the communes in Schuttrange and Weiler-La-Tour with whom they share a social office in Moutfort.

Contern endeavours to get the entire population to speak a large variety of languages. Many Local Children speak Luxembourgish, French, German and even English. The commune wishes to spread the speaking of all these languages to everyone in their boundaries, assisted heavily by their Luxembourgish Courses.

Luxembourgish has been on the rise recently, with many documents being posted in Luxembourgish, sometimes exclusively, the commune of Contern is encouraging learning of the national language through courses set up exclusively by them. Courses occur yearly and are encouraged due to the large immigrant population of the commune.

Municipality 
The commune of Contern operates many of the services of its designated area. The commune runs multiple buildings such as the Town Hall, Municipal Workshop, Social office, etc. It also issues many public documents available online and job applications to work for the commune directly are possible, even for people as young as 16. All new regulations made the by the commune are also available in PDF form online. The human resources department service is responsible for managing Municipal jobs, this includes jobs for students aged 16 and over during the summer. The commune also offers the "cost of living allowance." It comes from the FNS and can be applied for so long as the decision is enclosed with the SNSF agreement. Like many other things it has a PDF to accompany with, which is supposed to be filled in. There's also a separate National Fund for Low income citizens, the total sum is determined mostly by their household.

WIFI4EU 
Contern has worked with the European Commission to bring publicly available WI-FI to certain areas of the commune. These include both the site of the former school and parts of the current one, Prince Charles Park in Oetrange, the park in Moutfort and the Cultural Centre in Medingen. These by no coincidence, are all located within the 4 main settlements in Contern. There are potentially more areas which meet the criteria set by the European Commission to warrant a new hotspot but none are planned for the moment. WIFI4EU is by no means unique to Contern.

References

External links
 
 Link to Commune's Website https://www.contern.lu/fr/Pages/default.aspx

 
Communes in Luxembourg (canton)
Towns in Luxembourg